Byron Wardsworth Yarrison (March 9, 1896 in Montgomery, Pennsylvania – April 22, 1977 in Williamsport, Pennsylvania) was a professional baseball pitcher. He pitched parts of two seasons in Major League Baseball, for the Philadelphia Athletics in 1922 and the Brooklyn Robins in 1924. He attended Gettysburg College.

External links

Major League Baseball pitchers
Philadelphia Athletics players
Brooklyn Robins players
Hanover Raiders players
Rocky Mount Tar Heels players
Portland Beavers players
Los Angeles Angels (minor league) players
Gettysburg Bullets baseball players
Baseball players from Pennsylvania
1896 births
1977 deaths